Windsor County is a county located in the U.S. state of Vermont. As of the 2020 census, the population was 57,753. The shire town (county seat) is the town of Woodstock. The county's largest municipality is the town of Hartford.

History
Windsor County is one of several Vermont counties created from land ceded by the State of New York on 15 January 1777 when Vermont declared itself to be a distinct state from New York. The land originally was contested by Massachusetts, New Hampshire, and New Netherland, but it remained undelineated until July 20, 1764, when King George III established the boundary between Province of New Hampshire and Province of New York along the west bank of the Connecticut River, north of Massachusetts and south of the parallel of 45 degrees north latitude. New York assigned the land gained to Albany County. On March 12, 1772, Albany County was partitioned to create Charlotte County, and this situation remained until Vermont's independence from New York and Britain.

Windsor County was established on February 16, 1781, from parts of Cumberland County and organized the same year.

Windsor County is notable for being the birthplace (1805) of Joseph Smith, Jr., founder of the Latter Day Saint movement. Calvin Coolidge, the 30th U.S. president, was also born in Windsor County.

Geography
It is the largest county by area in Vermont.

Adjacent counties
 Orange County - north
 Grafton County, New Hampshire - northeast
 Sullivan County, New Hampshire - east
 Windham County - south
 Bennington County - southwest
 Rutland County - west
 Addison County - northwest

National parks
 Green Mountain National Forest (part)
 Marsh-Billings-Rockefeller National Historical Park
 White Rocks National Recreation Area (part)

Major highways

Demographics

2000 census
As of the 2000 census, there were 57,418 people, 24,162 households, and 15,729 families living in the county.  The population density was 59 people per square mile (23/km2).  There were 31,621 housing units at an average density of 33 per square mile (13/km2).  The racial makeup of the county was 97.72% White, 0.33% Black or African American, 0.23% Native American, 0.63% Asian, 0.03% Pacific Islander, 0.15% from other races, and 0.91% from two or more races.  0.82% of the population were Hispanic or Latino of any race. 20.1% were of English, 12.9% Irish, 10.9% American, 9.9% French, 7.7% German, 6.7% French Canadian and 5.5% Italian ancestry. 96.4% spoke English and 1.5% French as their first language.

There were 24,162 households, out of which 29.20% had children under the age of 18 living with them, 52.70% were married couples living together, 9.00% had a female householder with no husband present, and 34.90% were non-families. 28.10% of all households were made up of individuals, and 11.10% had someone living alone who was 65 years of age or older.  The average household size was 2.35 and the average family size was 2.86.
In the county, the population was spread out, with 23.30% under the age of 18, 5.90% from 18 to 24, 27.30% from 25 to 44, 27.60% from 45 to 64, and 15.80% who were 65 years of age or older.  The median age was 41 years. For every 100 females, there were 94.80 males.  For every 100 females age 18 and over, there were 92.10 males.

The median income for a household in the county was $40,688, and the median income for a family was $59,002. Males had a median income of $42,648 versus $25,696 for females. The per capita income for the county was $22,369.  About 3.20% of families and 5.70% of the population were below the poverty line, including 7.50% of those under age 18 and 7.60% of those age 65 or over.

In 2007, the census department estimated that Windsor had the oldest average age in the state, 44.7. This compares with the actual census in 2000 of 41.3 years.

2010 census
As of the 2010 United States Census, there were 56,670 people, 24,753 households, and 15,420 families living in the county. The racial makeup of the county was 96.3% white, 0.9% Asian, 0.6% black or African American, 0.3% American Indian, 0.2% from other races, and 1.7% from two or more races. Those of Hispanic or Latino origin made up 1.2% of the population.

Of the 24,753 households, 25.9% had children under the age of 18 living with them, 49.1% were married couples living together, 9.0% had a female householder with no husband present, 37.7% were non-families, and 30.0% of all households were made up of individuals. The average household size was 2.25 and the average family size was 2.77. The median age was 45.8 years.

The median income for a household in the county was $50,893 and the median income for a family was $63,387. Males had a median income of $44,610 versus $34,150 for females. The per capita income for the county was $29,053. About 5.6% of families and 9.7% of the population were below the poverty line, including 12.5% of those under age 18 and 7.6% of those age 65 or over.

Politics
Since Vermont began using the popular vote in presidential elections in 1828, Windsor County has voted for the statewide winner in every presidential election in the state's history with the exception of 1912 when it voted for Progressive candidate Theodore Roosevelt over statewide winner William Taft. Mirroring the politics of the state as a whole, Windsor County was solidly Republican from its inception in the 1856 election until the 1980s, voting only for Democrat Lyndon Johnson in 1964 when he faced the highly conservative Barry Goldwater. It has supported the Democratic presidential candidate in every election since 1992. While the county did not swing as hard to the Democrats as other parts of Vermont, it has given the Democrats at least 55 percent of the vote at every election since 2004.

|}

Transportation

In 2009, the United States Department of Transportation measured  of "major arteries", the highest in the state.

Because US Route 4 had the "feel" of a freeway, motorists were inclined to speed. As a result, the Windsor County Sheriff's Department wrote 2,452 tickets in 2007.

Communities

Towns

Villages
Villages are census divisions, but have no separate corporate existence from the surrounding towns.
 Ludlow
 Perkinsville
 Woodstock

Census-designated places

Unincorporated communities

 Brownsville
 Felchville
 Gaysville
 Hartland Four Corners
 Lewiston
 North Pomfret
 Plymouth Notch
 Weathersfield Bow
 West Hartford

See also
 List of counties in Vermont
 List of towns in Vermont
 National Register of Historic Places listings in Windsor County, Vermont
 USS Windsor (APA-55), an attack transport named for Windsor County

References

External links
 National Register of Historic Places listing for Windsor Co., Vermont

 
1781 establishments in Vermont
Populated places established in 1781
Lebanon micropolitan area